The National Party under D.F. Malan was elected by a majority of seats, but a minority of votes, in the 1948 South African general election.

Shuffle
 The Minister of Education, Health and Social Welfare was replaced by Dr. Karl Bremer on 12 February 1951. The previous Minister, The Hon. A.J. Stals MP, died shortly after in March of the same year.
 The Minister of Natural Affairs was replaced by Hendrik Verwoerd in 1950.

Cabinet

Citations

Sources

Government of South Africa
Executive branch of the government of South Africa
Cabinets of South Africa
1948 establishments in South Africa
1955 disestablishments in South Africa
Cabinets established in 1948
Cabinets disestablished in 1953